William Chan Wai-ting (born 21 November 1985) is a Hong Kong singer, dancer and actor. In 2003, he participated in New Talent Singing Awards where he won several awards. He was then signed under Emperor Entertainment Group. He began his singing career by joining Cantopop group Sun Boy'z in 2006 and left the group in 2008 to pursue a solo career, releasing his debut solo album in the same year. Since then, he has released a total of 7 albums and 6 singles.

Since 2013, he gradually shifted his career focus to mainland China. He is known for his roles in television series Swords of Legends (2014), The Mystic Nine (2016), Lost Love in Times (2017), Age of Legends (2018) and Novoland: Pearl Eclipse(2021).

Music career

2003–2006: Debut with Sun Boy'z 
In 2003, William participated in the International Chinese New Talent Singing Championship Hong Kong regional finals and won several awards. He was then signed by Emperor Entertainment Group (EEG) as a new talent and started appearing in TV shows as a host.

In 2006, William joined Sun Boy'z, a Cantopop boy group created by EEG, together with Steven Cheung and Dennis Mark and started adopting a dance-singer persona. The trio has recorded three albums in 2006 and 2007, but disbanded in 2008.

2008–2014: Solo career
After the disbandment of his group, William began his solo career. In September 2008, William released his first solo album Will Power, and won the Most Popular Male Newcomer award at the 2008 Hong Kong Jade Solid Gold Best Ten Music Awards Presentation and Most Promising Award at the RTHK Top 10 Gold Songs Awards. The following year, William released his second solo album Warrior. He also participated in Dragon TV's dance program Let's Shake It.

From 2010 to 2013, William released four more albums, namely Do You Wanna Dance (2010),  Heads or Tails (2010), WOW (2011) and Pop It Up (2013).

2015–present: Development in Mainland
In 2015, William released his first EP titled Waiting, which is also his first Mandarin album. Waiting was a commercial success and achieved platinum certification in sales. The same year in November, he released his self-composed single "1121".

In 2016, William released the single "Plan W", which topped local music charts and reached ten million downloads in 12 hours. 
On 27 August 2016, William embarked on his first solo tour Inside Me which kick-started in Beijing. It was subsequently held in the cities Shanghai, Nanjing, Chongqing and Guangzhou.

In 2018, he acted as a dance mentor in iQiyi's reality online street dance variety program Hot Blood Dance Crew, as well as a mentor in Dragon Television's talent scouting program The Next Top Bang.

In 2019, William featured in the hit rap song "Wild Wolf Disco".

In 2020, his second solo tour originally scheduled to kick-start in Guangzhou on 14 March 2020 was postponed due to the global COVID-19 pandemic.

Acting career

2009–2013: Beginnings in Hong Kong
In 2009, William made his big screen debut in crime thriller Overheard. He was cast in his first lead role in Hi, Fidelity (2011), which was showcased at the 35th Hong Kong International Film Festival.

William then starred in the Hong Kong-Chinese film As the Light Goes Out (2013), which won him the Best Supporting Actor award at the Macau International Movie Festival for his performance.

2014–2015: Breakthrough in Mainland
In 2013, William began to shift his career focus to Mainland China. He filmed his first Chinese drama, The Four, an adaptation of Woon Swee Oan's novel Si Da Ming Bu. The drama was aired on Hunan TV in 2015.

Subsequently, he starred in the fantasy action drama Swords of Legends. It was a huge success and topped viewership ratings and online views in China. The popularity of Swords of Legends shot William to fame in China, and he won the Most Popular All-Around Artist and Media's Most Anticipated Actor awards at the 6th China TV Drama Awards. The same year, William starred in the comedy film Golden Brother and won the Best Young Actor award at the China Image Film Festival for his performance.

William then starred in his first period drama, Legend of Fragrance alongside his Swords of Legends co-star Li Yifeng. The same year, he took on his first small-screen leading role in the fantasy wuxia drama Legend of Zu Mountain.

2016–present: Mainstream popularity
In 2016, William starred in the tomb-raiding drama The Mystic Nine, which serves as a prequel to the popular web drama The Lost Tomb by Nanpai Sanshu. The Mystic Nine achieved success, placing first in television ratings and setting a record for the most online views garnered in a day, and has accumulated over 10 billion views. William gained a surge in popularity for his role as Fo Ye, and was named the "Person of the Year" at the iQiyi All-Star Carnival. The same year, he starred alongside Jessica Jung in the romantic comedy film I Love That Crazy Little Thing and featured in Guo Jingming's fantasy blockbuster L.O.R.D: Legend of Ravaging Dynasties.

In 2017, William starred in the historical fantasy drama Lost Love in Times.

In 2018, William headlined the war epic film Genghis Khan, as well as modern romance drama Only Side by Side with You and crime action drama Age of Legends He also starred as a supporting role in the war film Air Strike.

In 2019, William starred in the romance film Adoring.

In 2020, the second part of Guo Jingming's fantasy blockbuster L.O.R.D: Legend of Ravaging Dynasties 2 was released via on-line streaming.

In 2021, William starred as the main antagonist in fantasy film The Yinyang Master, as well as the main protagonist in cyber security action drama The Dance of the Storm and historical fantasy drama Novoland: Pearl Eclipse. 

In 2023, he starred in film Faces in the Crowd. His upcoming works include film Bursting Point and drama A Date with the Future.

Other activities
In 2016, William was appointed as the first Chinese ambassador of the NFL China.

In 2017, his wax figure dressed up as his role in The Mystic Nine was added to Madame Tussauds Shanghai. In 2018, a second wax figurine dressed in his concert attire was added to Madame Tussauds Beijing.

In 2018, William's fashion brand Williamism collaborated with other companies (New Era, Reebok, UCCA, Aftermaths) to produce his own brand of caps, shoes, T-shirts and skiing attire.

In 2020, he was a mentor in comedian talent scouting show Gagman and starred in reality sales-marketing series "Fourtry Season 2". He also established his own fashion brand CANOTWAIT_, which partnered with luxury car brand Maserati to release a limited edition sedan in 2021 .

In 2022, he took part as a regular in outdoor camping variety show Camping Life, followed by Camping Life Season 2 in 2023.

Discography

Albums

Singles

Soundtracks and Promotional Songs

Others

Filmography

Film

Television series

Variety show (Compere/Fixed Cast)

Awards and nominations

Film and television

Music

Forbes China Celebrity 100

References

External links
 

Sun Boy'z members
1985 births
Living people
21st-century Hong Kong male actors
21st-century Hong Kong male singers
Cantopop singers
Hong Kong Mandopop singers
Hong Kong male dancers
Hong Kong male television actors
Hong Kong male film actors
Hong Kong television presenters
Hong Kong idols